Kendra Hubbard (born 29 September 1989) is an Australian athlete. She qualified in the women's 4 × 400 metres relay event at the 2020 Summer Olympics held in Tokyo, Japan.

References

External links

1989 births
Living people
Australian female sprinters
Place of birth missing (living people)
University of Melbourne alumni sportspeople
Olympic athletes of Australia
Athletes (track and field) at the 2020 Summer Olympics
21st-century Australian women